Sam Hamill (May 9, 1943 – April 14, 2018) was an American poet and the co-founder of Copper Canyon Press along with Bill O’Daly and Tree Swenson. He also initiated the Poets Against War movement (2003) in response to the Iraq War.
In 2003 Hamill he did a poetic tour in Italy, organised by writer Alessandro Agostinelli. After that tour Hamill published his first italian book A Pisan Canto - Un canto pisano.

Hamill was awarded the Stanley Lindberg Lifetime Achievement Award for Editing and the Washington Poets Association Lifetime Achievement Award.

Hamill's most recent book, Habitation: Collected Poems, presents some of Hamill's best poems spanning a career of over 40 years.

Poetry Books
Facing Snow: Visions of Tu Fu [White Pine Press, 1988] (Sam Hamill, translator)
Crossing the Yellow River: Three Hundred T'ang Poems [Tiger Bark Press, 2013] (Sam Hamill, translator)
Destination Zero: Poems 1970–1995 (1995).
The Gift of Tongues: Twenty-Five Years of Poetry from Copper Canyon Press (1996, Copper Canyon Press)(Sam Hamill, editor)
Almost Paradise: New and Selected Poems and Translations (2005).
Measured by Stone (2007).
A Pisan Canto - Un canto pisano (2008, Edizioni ETS, Italy)
Habitation: Collected Poems (2014, University of Washington Press)

In Anthology
Ghost Fishing: An Eco-Justice Poetry Anthology (2018, University of Georgia Press)
Seeds of Fire: Contemporary Poetry from the Other U.S.A. (2008, Smokestack Books)

References

External links
 , The Progressive.
Copper Canyon Press website
苏州review - Sam Hamill: A poet’s commitments, Sam Hamill: A poet's commitments, Suzhou Review
, 哈米尔：梦里东方，文化寻根 苏州日报（Suzhou Daily）

1943 births
2018 deaths
American male poets
American book publishers (people)
PEN Oakland/Josephine Miles Literary Award winners
Place of birth missing
Place of death missing
People from Salt Lake County, Utah